Mrzenci is a village in Municipality of Gevgelija, North Macedonia.

Demographics
As of the 2021 census, Mrzenci had 525 residents with the following ethnic composition:
Macedonians 502
Persons for whom data are taken from administrative sources 16
Serbs 5
Others 2

According to the 2002 census, the village had a total of 461 inhabitants. Ethnic groups in the village include:
Macedonians 458
Serbs 1
Aromanians 1
Others 1

References

Villages in Gevgelija Municipality